Cristian Orlando Vega (born 17 September 1993) is an Argentine professional footballer who plays as a midfielder for Colón.

Career
Vega started his career with Central Córdoba of Torneo Argentino A. He made five appearances in his debut campaign, including his debut against Central Norte on 25 January 2013 as the club were eliminated in the second round of the promotion play-offs. Two seasons later, in 2014, Vega made eleven appearances as they won promotion to Primera B Nacional; his professional bow subsequently arrived in July 2015 against Villa Dálmine. Vega scored his first senior goal on 13 October 2016 as Central Córdoba beat Los Andes 1–0.

On 26 January 2022, Vega joined Colón on a deal until the end of 2024.

Career statistics
.

Honours
Central Córdoba
Torneo Federal A: 2017–18

References

External links

1993 births
Living people
People from Santiago del Estero
Argentine footballers
Association football midfielders
Central Córdoba de Santiago del Estero footballers
Club Atlético Colón footballers
Argentine Primera División players
Torneo Argentino A players
Torneo Federal A players
Primera Nacional players
Sportspeople from Santiago del Estero Province